The 1980 Allan Cup was the Canadian senior ice hockey championship for the 1979–80 senior "A" season.  The event was hosted by the Spokane Flyers in Spokane, Washington.  The 1980 playoff marked the 72nd time that the Allan Cup has been awarded.

The 1980 Allan Cup was the fourth Allan Cup championship to be hosted by an American city.

Teams
Cambridge Hornets (Eastern Canadian Champions)
Spokane Flyers (Western Canadian Champions)

Best-of-Seven Series
Spokane Flyers 5 - Cambridge Hornets 3
Spokane Flyers 2 - Cambridge Hornets 1
Spokane Flyers 5 - Cambridge Hornets 2
Spokane Flyers 4 - Cambridge Hornets 3

External links
Allan Cup archives 
Allan Cup website

Allan Cup